was a Japanese sculptor specializing in "iki-ningyo" or lifelike dolls. A number of his works have survived in American and British collections, notably those of Ripley's Believe it or Not and the Sheffield Museum (the home town of the father of the Deakin Brothers of Yokohama, dealers in oriental art and curios in the 1890s). One such figure shows a naked Japanese man anatomically correct down to hairs inserted in his gofun skin, holding a small mask in his hand (i.e. a mask sculptor), about life-size. This was exhibited in San Francisco during about 1895–1906, and was depicted on a souvenir token from the Art Saloon, its owner at the time. It was reputed to be a self-portrait of the artist. Elaborations of the legend about this very lifelike image continued up through the time of the image's purchase by Ripley's in 1934,Robert Ripley would often put the statue in guest rooms at night in order to scare them. His house on B.I.O.N (Believe It Or Not) Island Had a slew of other strange collectibles including this. through its exhibit at the Chicago World's Fair in 1934, and into the present. The story below is a version of this romantic tale.

Believing that he was dying from tuberculosis, Hananuma sculpted a life size statue of himself as a gift to the woman he loved, which was completed in 1885. The artist himself died 10 years later, in poverty aged 63.

The statue is renowned for being nearly identical in appearance to its creator. Made of between 2000 and 5000 wooden strips (reports differ),  it is connected only by dovetail joints, glue and wooden pegs. No joint is visible on the statue, and it is lacquered to show every detail of Hananuma, including muscle, bone and vein. The artist also manufactured anatomically correct glass eyeballs for the statue. Finally, individual holes were drilled in the statue to represent the pores of the skin, and the corresponding hair inserted.

The statue was later purchased by Robert Ripley in 1934, and was housed in his California Odditorium until his death in 1949. After Ripley's death, the masterpiece toured various Odditoriums until it was stored in the Los Angeles Odditorium where it was damaged in the 1994 Northridge earthquake. The statue is currently on display in the Amsterdam Odditorium, located on Dam Square and a replica is in the London Odditorium, located at 1 Piccadilly Circus.

See also
Ripley's Believe it or Not
Fine art
Sculpture

External links
The statue
The Wrestlers by Hananuma Masakichi
"Jap Statue" token from the San Francisco Art Saloon, now in the Fine Arts Museum of San Francisco

References

http://www.anomalies-unlimited.com/Death/Masakichi.html
"The World of Ripley's Believe It or Not"

1832 births
1895 deaths
Japanese sculptors
19th-century sculptors
Male sculptors